Tactusa schnacki is a moth of the family Erebidae first described by Michael Fibiger in 2010. It is known from Assam in north-eastern India.

The wingspan is about 12 mm. The forewing is narrow and pointed at the apex. The ground colour is brownish, but darker by the costal patch in the medial area and in the subterminal area. Only the terminal line is visible, marked by interneural black spots. The hindwing is dark grey with an indistinct discal spot and the underside is unicolorous grey.

References

Micronoctuini
Taxa named by Michael Fibiger
Moths described in 2010